Mangualde is a municipality in the subregion of Dão-Lafões (historical Beira Interior), central region of Portugal. The population in 2011 was 19,880, in an area of 219.26 km2.

History
The region of Mangualde has been a crossroads of many peoples: Viriathus's warriors, transhumance shepherds, Romans, Moors and Christian conquerors, including soldiers from Castile or France, or even pilgrims. Mangualde was an important outpost in the textile trade from Covilhã, Seia and Gouveia. Its location, on the frontier with the Serra da Estrela and marginalized by its geography to north, was nonetheless a channel of pre-historic cultures associated with the dolmens that are found through the region. The mount of Nossa Senhora do Castelo, is one such example of the pre-Romanic castros that were used by the early settlers, then reappropriated by the Roman soldiers as forts.

The Romans, attracted by the riches of the Iberian Peninsula (primarily minerals), began to progressively occupy the region until the 5th century, when barbarians invaded the peninsula. Romanization of these lands resulted in a diffusion and assimilation of cultural structures, political hierarchies, social institutions, the economy and religious services. Mangualde was one of the principal access-ways in Lusitânia, connecting Emerita Augusta (Mérida) to Bracara Augusta (Braga). Along the roadway, millennium or road markers were discovered in Abrunhosa-a-Velha, noting the repairs completed to the road under emperors Hadrian and Numerian. Similarly, a second via crossed the Alcafache bridge (a Roman-built structure) towards Espinho, while another crossed the rivers from the north.

After the barbarian invasions, the region was also taken by Muslim forces, who occupied the area of Nossa Senhora do Castelo. This place became known by the military governor, Zurara, and the fort constructed on the site referred to asCastelo de Zurara (or also Castelo de Azurara), over time becoming transliterated in ancient name of the municipality: Azurara da Beira. In 1058, the medieval castle was conquered from the Moors, by the forces of Ferdinand I of León and Castile. By 1102, Count Henrique and Countess Theresa, before the independence of Portugal, issued a foral to the lands of Zurara, between the Dão and Mondego Rivers. It was later confirmed by Afonso II, when the monarch issued his ordinances in February 1217, and by King Manuel in 1514, during his reforms. When Christian forces finally took the fortress, they discovered a privileged lookout that provided line-of-sight for thousands of miles.

During the Middle Ages, the town of Mangualde grew from two distinct poles: the first was designated Cabo da Vila and the other Rossio.

With time, even the population of Rossio began to develop into another distinct neighborhood. Around this time (the middle of the 17th century) the new space was nothing more than some modest dwellings occupied by locals.

After the 17th century, with the creation of the Misericórdia by Philip II, the institution of "outside" judges by King John IV (1655), Mangualde experienced a period of great expansion.

In the 19th century, residential growth was significant, helped on by the construction of a new highway towards Guarda, which contributed to this development. Over time, the two original poles merged (in the 20th century), and Rossio took on a greater role: many of the social and economic functions of Mangualde concentrated in Rossio, including public services, banking, commercial shops and cafes.

On 3 July 1986, the Portuguese Assembly ratified the elevation of the town to the category of city.

Geography
Mangualde is dominated by a plateau/table sloping to the south, cut by tributaries of the Dão and Mondego Rivers: the municipality is crossed in the north by the Dão River defining its northern frontier, while its southern border is limited by the Mondego. In addition to these rivers, Mangualde is crossed by a series of gently-flowing ravines and rivers, such as the Ribeira de Frades, Ribeira do Castelo and the  Ribeira de Videira, in the western extend of the municipality. The Fagilde reservoir is the largest extension of these limits, and supports the community to the north of Mangualde.

Along the valleys there are many fertile alluvial lands, of which, the more fertile parcels are located in the central part of the municipality, around the civil parishes of Mangualde, Fornos de Maceira Dão, Espinho and Alcafache.

Geomorphologically, Mangualde is part of the Maciço Antigo (Old Massif), dating to the Paleozoic. It was affected by a period of prolonged erosion, that was later rejuvenated by upheaval associated with mountain-building. Most of the area is composed of granite, and mitigated by mountain hydrology. A small group of mountains along the east, the Serra do Bom Successo, extend to Guimarães de Tavares. In addition, other mountainous areas include the Serras de Abrunhosa-a-Velha, Cunha Alta and Almeidinha which link to the Serra da Senhora do Castelo.  Disperse and running along lower elevations, the topography is highlighted by the higher elevations in Tabosa, Roda an Fagilde.

Climate
The climate is Mediterranean, influenced by continental systems, resulting in cold winters and warm, dry summers.

Human geography

Located 15 kilometres from the district seat of Viseu, the municipality of Mangualde is surrounded by Penalva do Castelo (to the north), Viseu (to the west), Nelas, Seia and Gouveia (to the south) and Fornos de Algodres (to the east).

Administratively, the municipality is divided into 12 civil parishes (freguesias):

 Abrunhosa-a-Velha
 Alcafache
 Cunha Baixa
 Espinho
 Fornos de Maceira Dão
 Freixiosa
 Mangualde, Mesquitela e Cunha Alta
 Moimenta de Maceira Dão e Lobelhe do Mato
 Quintela de Azurara
 Santiago de Cassurrães e Póvoa de Cervães
 São João da Fresta
 Tavares (Chãs, Várzea e Travanca)

Economy
Stellantis has a plant in Mangualde founded in 1962 by Citroën which began operations in 1964. Light industry in metallurgy, textiles, timber, stone and construction are also found in the municipality. Agriculture, including blueberry production, forestry and animal production, specially sheep and poultry, are other important economic activities in Mangualde Municipality.

Architecture

Archaeology

 Castro of Bom Sucesso
 Dolmen of Cunha Baixa

Civic

 Citânia de Raposeira
 Fountain of Ricardina
 Palace of the Counts of Anadia
 Pillory of Abrunhosa-a-Velha
 Pillory of Chãs de Tavares
 Old Clock-tower

Religious

 Chapel of Nossa Senhora de Cervães
 Church of São Julião
 Church of the Misericórdia
 Hermitage of Nossa Senhora do Castelo
 Monastery of Santa Maria de Maceira Dão

Notable people 
 Ana de Castro Osório (1872–1935) a feminist, active in the field of children's literature and political Republicanism.
 Elza Pais (born 1958) a sociology academic and politician  
 Vanda Maria Ribeiro Furtado Tavares de Vasconcelos (born 1962), known as Lio, a Portuguese-Belgian singer and actress.

Sport 
 Ricardo Jorge Marques Duarte (born 1982), known as Mangualde,  a retired footballer with 253 club caps
 Bruno Albuquerque (born 1989 in Quintela de Azurara) a middle- and long-distance runner.
 Filipa Rodrigues (born 1993) a footballer, 13 caps with the Portugal women's national football team

References

External links

Photos of Mangualde

 
Populated places in Viseu District
Municipalities of Viseu District